Ranny Rassvet is a rural locality (a village) in Oktyabrsky Selsoviet, Sterlitamaksky District, Bashkortostan, Russia. The population was 115 as of 2010. There are 3 streets.

Geography 
Ranny Rassvet is located 17 km west of Sterlitamak (the district's administrative centre) by road. Vesyoly is the nearest rural locality.

References 

Rural localities in Sterlitamaksky District